Broc Little (born March 24, 1988) is an American professional ice hockey forward currently playing for Linköping HC of the Swedish Hockey League (SHL).

Playing career
Little is a graduate of Cushing Academy in Ashburnham, in his freshman year at Cushing he played with the teams leading point scorer - future NHL defenseman Keith Yandle. Prior to turning professional, Little attended Yale University, where he played four seasons with the Yale Bulldogs men's ice hockey team which competes in NCAA's Division I in the ECAC Hockey conference. In his 3rd year (2009–10) Little was named to the All-ECAC Hockey First-Team.

Little spent the first two professional seasons of his career in Sweden with VIK Västerås HK of the Second Tier Allsvenskan and AIK of the Elitserien (SEL). In both seasons, Little led his club in scoring with 66 points in 51 games for Västerås and 46 in 55 games for AIK. He led the Allsvenskan for highest points total in 2012 and placed fifth in the Elitserien in 2013.

On July 26, 2013, Little returned to North America as a free agent to sign a one-year AHL contract with the Springfield Falcons, an affiliate of the Columbus Blue Jackets. In the 2013–14 season after only 20 games with the Falcons, Little was released from his contract on January 16, 2014. On January 17, 2014, Little signed a Professional Tryout with the Iowa Wild of the AHL. After a solitary game with the Wild, Little opted to resume his European career in signing for the remainder of the season with Finnish Liiga club, Jokerit on January 20, 2014.

With Jokerit bound for the Kontinental Hockey League, Little left the team as a free agent and returned to the SHL in signing a contract with Linköpings HC on April 16, 2014. He was the league's leading goal scorer in the 2014–15 season (28). Little left Linköping at the conclusion of the 2016–17 season and moved to HC Davos of the National League (NL).

Career statistics

Regular season and playoffs

International

Awards and honors

References

External links 

1988 births
AIK IF players
American men's ice hockey forwards
HC Davos players
Ice hockey people from Arizona
Ice hockey players at the 2018 Winter Olympics
Iowa Wild players
Jokerit players
Linköping HC players
Living people
Olympic ice hockey players of the United States
Sportspeople from Phoenix, Arizona
Springfield Falcons players
VIK Västerås HK players
Yale Bulldogs men's ice hockey players
AHCA Division I men's ice hockey All-Americans